Klaus Werner Iohannis (also spelled Johannis; born 13 June 1959) is a Romanian politician, physicist, and former teacher who has been serving as the president of Romania since 2014. He became leader of the National Liberal Party (PNL) in 2014, after serving as leader of the Democratic Forum of Germans in Romania (FDGR/DFDR) between 2002 and 2013. Prior to entering politics, Iohannis was a physics teacher.

Iohannis was elected the mayor of the Transylvanian town of Sibiu in 2000, representing the Democratic Forum of Germans in Romania (FDGR/DFDR). Although the German population of the once predominantly German-speaking town of Sibiu had declined to a tiny minority, Iohannis won a surprise victory and was re-elected by landslides in 2004, 2008, and 2012. Iohannis is credited with turning his city into one of Romania's most popular tourist destinations, and the city was chosen to be the European Capital of Culture in 2007. In February 2013, Iohannis became a member of the National Liberal Party (PNL), accepting an invitation from then liberal leader Crin Antonescu, and was immediately elected the party's First Vice President, eventually becoming the PNL President during the following year.

In October 2009, four of the five political groups in the Parliament, excluding the Democratic Liberal Party (PDL) of then-President Traian Băsescu, proposed him as a candidate for the office of Prime Minister of Romania; however, Băsescu refused to nominate him despite the Parliament's adoption of a declaration supporting his candidacy. He was again the candidate for Prime Minister of the PNL and the Social Democratic Party (PSD) in the elections in the same year.

Ideologically a conservative, Iohannis is the first Romanian president to come from an ethnic minority, as he is a Transylvanian Saxon, part of Romania's German minority, which settled in Transylvania beginning in the 12th century. He was initially elected in 2014 and then subsequently re-elected by a landslide in 2019.

Personal and professional life 

Born in the historic centre of  Sibiu  to a Transylvanian Saxon family, Klaus Iohannis is the eldest child of Gustav Heinz and Susanne Johannis. He has a younger sister, Krista Johannis (born 1963). His father worked as a technician at an enterprise, while his mother was a nurse. Both his parents as well as his sister emigrated from their native Sibiu to Würzburg, Bavaria in Germany in 1992, acquiring citizenship there under the right of return granted by German nationality law, as most other Transylvanian Saxons after the fall of the Iron Curtain. However, he chose to live and work in Romania. As of 2014, his parents, sister and a niece live in Würzburg. 

Iohannis stated that his family settled in Transylvania in present-day Romania 850 years ago. 
After graduating from the Faculty of Physics of the Babeș-Bolyai University (UBB) in Cluj-Napoca in 1983, Iohannis worked as a high school physics teacher at various schools and colleges in Sibiu, including, from 1989 to 1997, the Samuel von Brukenthal National College in Sibiu, the oldest German-speaking school in Romania. From 1997 to 1999, he was Deputy General School Inspector of Sibiu County, and from 1999 until his election as mayor in 2000, he was the General School Inspector, head of public schools in the county.

Alongside his native German and Romanian, Iohannis also speaks English fluently and has some knowledge of French. The original German spelling of his name is Johannis, but the name was registered by a Romanian official as Iohannis on his birth certificate and he has used both spellings interchangeably. In 1989, he married ethnic Romanian Carmen Lăzurcă, an English teacher at the Gheorghe Lazăr National College in Sibiu. They have no children. Iohannis is also a member of the Evangelical Church of Augustan Confession in Romania, the German-speaking Lutheran church in Transylvania.

Political career 

He joined the Democratic Forum of Germans in Romania (FDGR/DFDR) in 1990, and served as a member of its board of education in Transylvania from 1997, and a member of the local party board in Sibiu from 1998. In 2001, he was elected President of the Democratic Forum of Germans in Romania (FDGR/DFDR), succeeding former president Eberhard Wolfgang Wittstock.

Mayor of Sibiu 

In 2000, the Democratic Forum of Germans in Romania in Sibiu/Hermannstadt (FDGS), the local chapter of the Democratic Forum of Germans (FDGR/DFDR), decided to back him as a candidate for mayor. While initially not wanting anything else than to represent the forum through a local candidate and to obtain a certain degree of local political visibility at that time, the leadership of FDGR/DFDR was surprised for his subsequent victory. 

Despite the fact that Sibiu's German minority (represented, more specifically, by Transylvanian Saxons) had shrunken to a mere 1.6%, Iohannis was elected with 69.18% of the votes and has won three re-elections in a row, getting some of the largest electoral scores in the country: 88.69% of the vote in 2004, and 83.26% in 2008.

Throughout his tenure as mayor, he has worked to restore the town's infrastructure and to tighten the local administration. Iohannis is also widely credited with turning his hometown into one of Romania's most popular tourist destinations thanks to the extensive renovation of the old downtown. During his first term, Iohannis worked with a town council which was formed by PDSR/PSD, FDGR/DFDR, PD, CDR, and PRM. Since 2004, during his second and third terms, his own party, FDGR/DFDR, had the majority. Between 2008 and 2012, FDGR/DFDR had 14 out of 23 councillors, PDL 4, PSD 3, and PNL only 2.

Iohannis established contacts with foreign officials and investors. Sibiu was declared the European Capital of Culture of 2007, along with Luxembourg (the bearer of the distinction in 1995). Luxembourg chose to share this honourable status with Sibiu due to the fact that many of the Transylvanian Saxons emigrated in the 12th century to Transylvania from the area where Luxembourg is today. Sibiu, or Hermannstadt in German, which was mainly built by the Transylvanian Saxons as early as the Middle Ages, was for many centuries the cultural centre of the German ethnic group in Transylvania, and was a predominantly German-speaking town until the mid 20th century. Subsequently, many Germans left the town after World War II, and especially in 1990, within months of the fall of the Iron Curtain.

On 7 November 2005, Iohannis was nominated as the "Personality of the Year for a European Romania" by the Eurolink – House of Europe organization.

Candidacy for the Prime Minister of Romania (supported by the PSD)
On 14 October 2009, the leaders of the opposition parliamentary groups (the National Liberal Party, the Social Democratic Party, the Democratic Alliance of Hungarians in Romania, the Conservative Party led by Dan Voiculescu, and the group of smaller ethnic minorities), proposed Iohannis as a candidate for the Prime Minister of Romania, after the government of Prime Minister Emil Boc fell a day before as a result of a motion of no confidence in the Parliament. Coming from outside the national-level politics of Romania, Iohannis had an image of an independent politician, although his party (i.e. FDGR/DFDR) consistently allied itself with, and Iohannis campaigned in the prior European Parliament elections for, the National Liberal Party (PNL).

Subsequently, the National Liberal Party (PNL), the Social Democratic Party (PSD), the Democratic Alliance of Hungarians in Romania (UDMR), and the group of small ethnic minorities in the Parliament subsumed Iohannis as their common candidate for Prime Minister of an interim government. On 14 October, Iohannis confirmed acceptance of his candidacy. However, on 15 October President Traian Băsescu nominated Lucian Croitoru, a top Romanian economist, as Prime Minister, and charged the latter with forming the country's next government.

After the second round of negotiations, a day before Croitoru's nomination, Băsescu noted: "Some parties have proposed Klaus Iohannis. I would like you to know that I have not rejected the possibility for him to become Prime Minister in the condition that my options would be directed towards other [national unity government] solutions. But I have rejected such a proposal because it comes from PSD or another party [PNL]", referring to his alleged constraint to consider a proposal of the largest party (PDL), constraint disputed by the other parties. The opposition criticized the President for not designating Iohannis. Social Democrat leader Mircea Geoană accused Băsescu of trying to influence the upcoming presidential elections by having them organised by a sympathetic government. Crin Antonescu, the leader of the National Liberals, vowed his party would derail other nominations but Iohannis'. After the nomination of Croitoru, Antonescu, a candidate in the presidential election, stated that he would nominate Iohannis as prime minister if elected president. Three days later, on 18 October, Geoană suggested Antonescu was trying to use Iohannis as an "electoral agent" for Antonescu's bid for president. In response, Antonescu told the press that Iohannis "is not the type of person that would let himself be used". Geoană and PSD leadership has held a second meeting with Iohannis in Bucharest in the evening of 18 October. UDMR, which the previous day announced it would also attend, declared in the morning that all their leaders were not in the city. PNL was present at the meeting with lower level representatives, after Antonescu announced in the morning that he was campaigning in Cluj-Napoca. On 21 October the Parliament adopted with 252 votes in favor (PSD, PNL, UDMR, and minorities groups) and 2 against a declaration requesting the President to nominate Iohannis as Prime Minister.

In the National Liberal Party (PNL)
On 20 February 2013, Klaus Iohannis joined the PNL, announcing this during a press conference with Crin Antonescu. At a PNL extraordinary congress, he was elected First Vice President of the Party. In the meeting of 28 June 2014, he was elected President of the PNL with 95% of the votes.

Candidacy for the President of Romania 

In 2009, Iohannis had stated that he might possibly run for the office of President of Romania, although not in that year. In addition, former Prime Minister Călin Popescu-Tăriceanu also stated on 27 October 2009 and again on 23 April 2010 that he would like to see Iohannis become either Prime Minister or President of Romania sometime in the future.

PNL and PDL started in the summer of 2014 procedures to strengthen the political right. The two parties will eventually merge under the name PNL, but went for elections in an alliance: the Christian Liberal Alliance. On 11 August the alliance chose Iohannis as its candidate for the presidential election in November and so he was registered as an official presidential candidate. In a late August 2014 interview, Iohannis described himself as a politruk who candidates for the presidency of Romania. He subsequently received 30.37% of the votes in the first round, finishing second and consequently qualifying for the second round. In the second round on 16 November he was elected President of Romania with 54.43% of the cast ballots.

President of Romania 

Iohannis took office on 21 December 2014, when Traian Băsescu's term ended. His presidential campaign focused on fighting corruption and on improving the justice system. Iohannis is also a supporter of a strongly pro-Western foreign policy. Regarding the unification of the Republic of Moldova with Romania, much discussed in the electoral campaign, Iohannis stated that "is something that only Bucharest can offer and only Chișinău can accept", and this "special relationship must be cultivated and enhanced especially by us [the Romanian state]".  Upon taking office, Iohannis suspended his membership in the National Liberal Party; the Romanian constitution does not allow the president to be a formal member of a political party during his tenure.

A heavily disputed draft law proposed by Nicolae Păun, leader of the Party of the Roma, regarding the amnesty of some misdemeanors and the pardoning of certain penalties was rejected by the Chamber of Deputies at the initiative of Klaus Iohannis and the party he led, after PNL asked the Judiciary Committee 17 times to reject the draft law.

The collaboration with socialist Prime Minister Victor Ponta was praised by both sides at the start of the mandate, but deteriorated thereafter once with foreign visits of the Head of the Executive, without informing the President, but especially with the criminal prosecution of Victor Ponta for 22 alleged corruption charges, prompting Iohannis to demand his resignation from the head of the Government. Relations with Parliament went similarly. Iohannis criticized the Parliament for defending MPs by rejecting the requests of the National Anticorruption Directorate for lifting their immunity, as in the case of PSD senator Dan Șova or Prime Minister Victor Ponta. Regarding the judicial system, Klaus Iohannis pleads for a sustained fight against corruption. Likewise, Iohannis expressed dissatisfaction with attempted amendments to the Penal Code. In the context of foreign policy, Iohannis and Andrzej Duda, the President of Poland, created Bucharest Nine during a meeting between both in Bucharest on 4 November 2015. The Russian annexation of Ukrainian Crimea and the country's intervention in the east of Ukraine are the main reason for the creation of the organization. It has nine members, Bulgaria, the Czech Republic, Estonia, Hungary, Latvia, Lithuania, Poland, Romania and Slovakia.

Since coming into office, President Klaus Iohannis has made a habit to hold consultations with parliamentary parties. The first round of consultations took place on 12 January, the purpose of these discussions being a political agreement that would ensure, by 2017, a minimum threshold of 2% of GDP for the Ministry of Defence, agreement signed by all parties. The second round of consultations focused on the legislative priorities of the parliamentary session: voting in diaspora, financing electoral campaigns and parties and lifting parliamentary immunity. Because the Parliament has not implemented the commitments made on 28 January, Iohannis has organised another series of consultations on the state of electoral laws, but also on rejection of Justice requests for approval of arrest or prosecution of MPs. The topics of other meetings between the president and parties focused on the Big Brother law package and the national defense strategy.

In February 2016, the National Agency for Fiscal Administration (ANAF) sent a notice of evacuation of the headquarters of two TV stations owned by Dan Voiculescu, sentenced in August 2014 to 10 years imprisonment in a corruption case with 60 million euros worth of prejudice. In this context, Klaus Iohannis stated that ANAF approach in Antena TV Group case is "hasty", "inappropriate" and that "freedom of expression in media can not be suppressed for trivial administrative reasons". His position was met with a wave of criticism from supporters and public figures. On the same note, Iohannis stated that union with Moldova is "a less serious approach" in the context of the Transnistria conflict, of differences between Romania and Moldova regarding economic stability and fighting corruption, and can be discussed when things are stable in both countries. The statement sparked indignation among unionists who accused him of demagogy, considering that during the electoral campaign of 2014 he expressed a favorable position on the issue. In March 2018, at the 100th anniversary of the Union of Bessarabia with Romania, he was absent from a plenary vote regarding the issue.

President Iohannis is considered the primary responsible for the 2021 Romanian political crisis, to the point that when asked in a CURS opinion poll from November 2021, 35% of respondents said that he is the main culprit for the said crisis. Critics consider him responsible for excluding the USR from the government during late 2021, and thereby allowing the PSD to be brought back to power. This happened on 25 November 2021, when the National Coalition for Romania was founded and the Ciucă Cabinet was sworn in. Two months later, he praised the new coalition, stating that "the Romanian political class has shown democratic maturity". Iohannis has also been criticized given the fact that during the two ruling years of the PSD-ALDE coalition (more specifically between 2017 and 2019), he sharply criticized the PSD. At the 2020 legislative elections, he called the electorate to vote, promising to get rid of the PSD. Some public figures in Romania, who in the past expressed their support for Klaus Iohannis, have criticized him for his double standard and lack of proper governance. These critics include Vladimir Tismăneanu, Tudor Chirilă, Mircea Cărtărescu, Andrei Oișteanu, Cristian Tudor Popescu, and Gabriel Liiceanu.

Despite the fact that, officially, the President of Romania is not affiliated with any political party, Iohannis is also regarded as the de facto leader of the National Liberal Party (PNL).

International trips as President (2015–present)

Political positions

Unification of Romania and Moldova 
Regarding the unification of Romania and Moldova, Klaus Iohannis declared during the 2014 presidential campaign that the unification is something that only Bucharest can provide and only Chișinău can accept. "If Moldovan citizens want the unification with Romania, then nobody can stop them", stated Klaus Iohannis. After election, his position mitigated, stressing that, at the moment, Romania should support Moldova to consolidate its pro-European path. President Klaus Iohannis said that a possible unification of Romania and Moldova could be discussed at the moment things are going well and stable in the two countries.

Autonomy of the Hungarian minority 
In March 2017, a sub-group of the ethnically Hungarian Székely community in southeastern Transylvania launched a petition demanding autonomy for their region, arguing for political and administrative self-rule, their own elected president and flag, as well as the recognition of Hungarian as an official language next to Romanian. Iohannis, on a visit to the region in July, cautioned against decentralization and the creation of regions based on the ethnic origin of residents. He argued for more and improved cooperation between Romanians and Hungarians "as the only solution for us" instead, stressing local administrative reforms and developing the region.

On 28 April 2020, a draft legislation favouring the autonomy of Székely Land, submitted by two deputies of the Democratic Alliance of Hungarians in Romania (UDMR) in December 2019, was tacitly adopted by the Chamber of Deputies, the lower house of the Parliament of Romania, in which the Social Democratic Party (PSD) held a plurality of seats and all whilst the National Liberal Party led a minority government. The draft bill was automatically adopted after it exceeded the 45-day deadline for debate. On 29 April, Klaus Iohannis criticised the draft's adoption in a television speech, stating "as we ... fight the coronavirus pandemic, ... the PSD ... fights in the secret offices of the parliament to give Transylvania to the Hungarians". In his speech, he used Hungarian language in a mocking manner:  ['good day' in Romanian], dear Romanians;  ['good day' in Hungarian], PSD." On the same day, the draft was rejected in the Senate, with both PNL's and PSD's senators voting in favour of the rejection.

The president's speech was met with widespread criticism. Hungarian Minister of Foreign Affairs and Trade Péter Szijjártó described the statements of Iohannis as "particularly uncivilized and suitable for inciting hatred" and asked the Romanian president to show "more respect to Hungarians". In turn, Romanian Minister of Foreign Affairs Bogdan Aurescu called Szijjártó's statements "provocative and inadequate". In a radio interview, Hungarian Prime Minister Viktor Orbán also reacted to the speech, saying "we have never heard such remarks from Romania, not even in the worst, most antidemocratic, tumultuous times". The president's comments were also criticised by members of the Romanian opposition parties PSD and ALDE, but also by the confidence and supply USR (which has been supporting the PNL minority government since 2019). Iohannis was fined  by the National Council for Combating Discrimination (CNCD) for discrimination and ethnicity/nationality-based violation of the right to dignity.

Ukraine's education law 
Iohannis criticized Ukraine's 2017 education law, which makes Ukrainian the only language of education in state schools, and cancelled his visit to Kyiv in October 2017. Iohannis said that Ukraine's new education law "will drastically limit the access of minorities to education in their native language. We are deeply hurt by this. We have many Romanians in Ukraine."

Anticorruption
President Klaus Iohannis is a supporter of the fight against corruption in Romania. Since coming to power in November 2014, has sent several messages of support to prosecutors investigating sensitive cases against politicians accused of corruption. Making one of its important position was on 25 February 2016 at the annual meeting of the National Anticorruption Directorate: "From year to year the work of the National Anticorruption Directorate has become more effective as the number of cases investigated and complexity, as well as final decisions on confiscation and recovery of property from crime. You are a model of functional institution and created a performance standard. Through the work and achievements, you've earned the appreciation of the Romanian citizens who want to live in a just society, in a country without corruption, the institutions, elect to represent them and those who perform public functions are actually serving the people. The results obtained by you in fighting corruption, appreciated and beyond Romania's borders are a guarantee that the process of strengthening democracy and the rule of law in Romania are on track. I am convinced that we will be increasingly more powerful in applying the constitutional principle that nobody is above the law and to align our established practice in countries with democracies that put the citizen at the center of any policy", stated Klaus Iohannis.

He has rejected demands for the suspension of the head of Romania's National Anticorruption Directorate (DNA), Laura Codruța Kövesi.

LGBT rights 
In terms of LGBT rights and recognition of same-sex unions in Romania, Iohannis has not stated clearly his opinion:

However, he is pleading for the acceptance of differences and diversity: "nobody should be persecuted because they belong to a different group or they are different".

Regarding the initiative to amend Article 48 of the Constitution (prohibition of gay marriage) started by the Coalition for Family, Iohannis reiterated the concepts of tolerance and accepting one another. "It is wrong to give obedience or walk the path of religious fanaticism and ultimatum solicitations. I do not believe in them and do not support them. I believe in tolerance, trust and openness to other", said Iohannis in a press conference. Thus, Iohannis is the first top official in the country to open the discussion about same-sex marriages. His reaction was praised by international media, including The Washington Post, while religious and conservative organizations in Romania have criticized his position on LGBT rights.

Migration 
Iohannis has said that migration "has to be controlled" and "it affects Romanian habits" and has supported stronger external European borders. Iohannis accepted the migration quota set for his country by the EU, but said he is still opposed to mandatory quotas being set by the commission.

Honours

National honours 

 : 
 Honorary senator of the Babeș-Bolyai University (UBB)
 : Grand Cross of the Order of the Star of Romania
 : Grand Master Member of the Order of merit
 Medal of Honor "Friend of the Jewish Communities in Romania" (2010)
 Honorary plaque of the Association of Expatriates in Germany (2010)
 Goldene Ehrennadel (i.e. Golden Badge of Honour) by the Democratic Forum of Germans in Romania (2019)

Foreign honours
 : Grand Officer of the Order of Honour for Services to the Republic of Austria
 : Knight Officer of the Order of the Crown
 : Order of the Balkan Mountains
 : Collar of the Order of the Cross of Terra Mariana (16 June 2021)
 : Officer of the Order of Merit of the Federal Republic of Germany
 : Charles IV Prize of the Sudeten Germans/Sudeten German Landsmannschaft
 : Charlemagne Prize
 : Kaiser Otto Prize from Magdeburg
 : Order of the Star of Italian Solidarity
 : Knight Grand Cross with Collar of the Order of Merit of the Italian Republic (30 May 2016)
 : Knight Grand Cross of the Order of the Gold Lion of the House of Nassau
 : Knight Officer of the Order of Merit of the Grand Duchy of Luxembourg
 : Order of the Republic
 : Order of the White Eagle

Books 

 2014 – Step by step, autobiographical volume and bestseller in the history of Gaudeamus International Book and Education Fair
 2015 – First step, a continuation of the volume "Step by step" of 2014. Talks about his plans as president.
 2019 – EU.RO – un dialog deschis despre Europa

Electoral history

Local elections (Mayor of Sibiu)

Presidential elections

References

External links

Klaus Iohannis Facebook official Page
 

|-

|-

|-

|-

1959 births
Candidates for President of Romania
Chairpersons of the National Liberal Party (Romania)
Conservatism in Romania
Democratic Forum of Germans in Romania politicians
Living people
Mayors of places in Romania
Officers Crosses of the Order of Merit of the Federal Republic of Germany
People from Sibiu
Physics educators
School inspectors
Presidents of Romania
Recipients of the Grand Decoration for Services to the Republic of Austria
Romanian educators
Romanian Lutherans
Romanian people of German descent
Romanian schoolteachers
Transylvanian Saxon people
Grand Crosses of the Order of the Star of Romania
Babeș-Bolyai University alumni